Fodil Megharia (born 23 May 1961) is a former Algerian footballer who played as a defender. He spent his entire club career with ASO Chlef (Algeria) and Club Africain (Tunisia), with whom he won the 1991 African Cup of Champions Clubs.

Career
An Algerian international, Megharia had 68 caps for the Algeria National Team and represented the team at the 1986 FIFA World Cup in Mexico. He was also a member of the 1990 African Cup of Nations winning team. He also played for Algeria at the 1986, 1988 and 1992 African Cup of Nations.

Honours

With clubs
 Tunisian Ligue 1 champion in 1990 and 1992 with Club Africain
 Tunisian Ligue 1 runners-up in 1989 and 1991 with Club Africain
 Tunisian Cup winner in 1992 with Club Africain
 Tunisian Cup runners-up in 1989 with Club Africain
 CAF Champions League winner in 1991 with Club Africain
 African Cup Winners' Cup runners-up in 1990 with Club Africain
 Afro-Asian Club Championship winner in 1992 with Club Africain

With the Algerian national team
 Won the 1990 Africa Cup of Nations once in Algeria
 Won the 1991 Afro-Asian Cup of Nations
 1 participations in the 1986 FIFA World Cup in Mexico

References

1961 births
1986 African Cup of Nations players
1986 FIFA World Cup players
1988 African Cup of Nations players
1990 African Cup of Nations players
1992 African Cup of Nations players
Algeria international footballers
Algerian expatriate sportspeople in Tunisia
Algerian expatriate footballers
Algerian footballers
ASO Chlef players
Club Africain players
Expatriate footballers in Tunisia
Living people
People from Chlef
Africa Cup of Nations-winning players
Association football defenders
21st-century Algerian people